Madikeri Fort also called Mercara Fort is a fort in Madikeri, in the Kodagu district of the Indian state of Karnataka, first built by Mudduraja in the second half of the 17th century. Mudduraja also built the palace within the fort.  It was rebuilt and restructured in granite by Tipu Sultan, and the site was then renamed Jaffarabad. Madikeri Fort is one of the many forts built or rebuilt by Tipu Sultan during his reign in the second half of the 18th century. In 1790, Dodda Vira Rajendra took control of the fort.   The palace underwent renovations by Linga Rajendra II from 1812-1814. The British made additions to the fort in 1834.  Notable structures in the fort include two stone statues of elephants at the northeast entry and a church in the southeast corner.

Today, the Madikeri Deputy Commissioner's Office is housed in the palace building, while St. Mark's Church houses the Madikeri Fort Museum, managed by the Karnataka State Archaeological Department. The museum has exhibits which display artifacts and weaponry from the time between the fort's construction and British rule. The museum also has a large portrait of Field Marshal K. M. Cariappa. The church was constructed in 1859 by soldiers of the East India Company, with funding from the Madras Presidency.  The church was administered by the Madras Diocese of the Church of England, but was closed after Indian independence, and taken over by the Government of Karnataka in 1971.

Gallery

References

Forts in Karnataka
Tourist attractions in Kodagu district
Buildings and structures in Kodagu district